The 2017 VTV Cup Championship is the 14th staging of the international tournament. The tournament will held in Hải Dương, Vietnam.

Pool composition
7 teams are set to participate at the tournament.
 (hosts)
 (hosts)

 Suwon City
 Beijing University

Preliminary round
All times are Vietnam Standard Time (UTC+07:00)

Group A 

|}

|}

Group B 

|}

|}

5-7th place 

|}

|}

Final round

Semi-finals

|}

3rd place

|}

Final

|}

Final standing

Awards

Most Valuable Player
 Yuka Imamura
Best Outside Spikers
 Tran Thi Thanh Thuy
 Manganang Aprilia Santini
Best Setter
 Mika Yamauchi

Best Opposite Spiker
 Misaki Yamauchi
Best Middle Blockers
 Nguyen Thi Ngoc Hoa
 Wilda Siti Nurfadilah
Best Libero
 Manami Kojima
Miss VTV Cup 2017
 Lee Jun Yung

References

VTV International Women's Volleyball Cup
Voll
2017 in women's volleyball